Boss Number One also is a Bangladeshi action film directed by Bangladeshi filmmaker Bodiul Alam Khokon. The film stars Shakib Khan, Nipun, Sahara and many more. Shakib Khan plays the title role and Nipun and Sahara play the role of his left and right hand. and  release on Eid al Adha of 7 November 2011. The film was filmed in Bangkok and Bangladesh. The movie is a remake of 2008 Telugu film Ontari.

Cast
 Shakib khan as Hridoy Khan/Boss Number One
 Nipun as Aasha Chowdhury
 Sahara as Aalo Chowdhury
 Misha Sawdagor as Dollar Talokdar
 Don            
 Prabir Mitra
 Rehana Jolly
 Ali Raj
 Shiba Shanu
 Ilias Kobra
 Tanu
 Rebeca
 Kabila

Production
The film was shot in Bangladesh, Thailand

Music
Boss Number One music was directed by Bangladeshi music director Ali Akram Shubho.

Track listing

Accolades

National Film Awards
 Best Actor in a negative role (Best Villain) - Misha Sawdagor (jointly with Shatabdi Wadud  for Guerrilla)

References

2011 films
2011 action films
Bangladeshi action films
Bengali-language Bangladeshi films
Bangladeshi remakes of Indian films
Films scored by Ali Akram Shuvo
2010s Bengali-language films
Films shot in Thailand
Bangladeshi remakes of Telugu films